Ndrulo, or Northern Lendu, is an ethnolinguistic group of the Democratic Republic of the Congo and Uganda. Ndrukpa speakers call their language Ndrulo.

References 

Central Sudanic languages